The second USS Hatteras was a Cunard Line freighter acquired by the U.S. Navy during World War I and was used to transport men and war materials to France. Post-war she was returned to the U.S. Shipping Board as redundant to needs.

Service history 

The second U.S. Navy ship to be named Hatteras was built in 1917 for the Cunard Line by the Bethlehem Shipbuilding Corp. of Sparrows Point, Maryland. Acquired by the U.S. Navy for the war effort, she commissioned 23 October 1917. After loading cargo, mainly iron, in Maryland, Hatteras joined a convoy at Norfolk, Virginia, and sailed for France on 26 January 1918. On 4 February the convoy ran into a severe North Atlantic Ocean storm, and Hatteras''' steering gear broke down completely. The disabled ship headed back to Boston, Massachusetts, using a jury-rigged steering system arriving 11 days later.

On 6 March she sailed again for France via Halifax, Nova Scotia, but 11 days later ran into another severe storm, and, once again, broken steering gear forced her to turn back to Boston. On 9 April Hatteras sailed for France for the third time, this time through relatively calm seas, and arrived in Nantes on the 30th. Cargo successfully discharged, she returned to Baltimore on 23 May. Thereafter she made four more Atlantic crossings, one to Nantes and three to Bordeaux, finally returning to New York City 19 March 1919.Hatteras decommissioned there on 8 April 1919 and the same day was returned to the United States Shipping Board (USSB), which retained her until she was abandoned at Shanghai in 1938. Taken into private ownership and renamed Hatterlock, she was subsequently seized by Japan in 1941 and operated by Miyachi Kisen KK of Kobe as Renzan Maru''.

References

External links 
 USS Hatteras (ID # 2142), 1917-1919
 Hatteras (ID 2172)

Ships built in Sparrows Point, Maryland
1917 ships
Standard World War I ships
Steamships of the United States
Cargo ships of the United States Navy
World War I cargo ships of the United States
World War I auxiliary ships of the United States